Smashing the Money Ring is a 1939 American adventure film directed by Terry O. Morse, written by Anthony Coldeway and Raymond L. Schrock, and starring Ronald Reagan, Margot Stevenson, Eddie Foy, Jr., Joe Downing, Charles D. Brown and Joe King. It was released by Warner Bros. on October 21, 1939.

Plot

A counterfeit money ring is being run from prison by a gangster, Dice Matthews, and a casino owner, Steve Parker, who is behind bars for slugging a cop. U.S. Secret Service agent Brass Bancroft goes undercover as a convict, getting help on the outside from his right-hand man, Gabby, while infiltrating the counterfeiting ring.

Parker's daughter, Peggy, becomes involved, identifying a guard who's also in on the scheme after her father is murdered. Bancroft and Matthews make a break for it, but although the guard shoots both, Bancroft recovers and sees that justice is done.

Cast 
Ronald Reagan as Lt. Brass Bancroft
Margot Stevenson as Peggy
Eddie Foy, Jr. as Gabby
Joe Downing as Dice Mathews
Charles D. Brown as Parker
Joe King as Saxby
William B. Davidson as Warden Denby 
Charles C. Wilson as Capt. Kilrane 
Elliott Sullivan as Danny Galloway
John Hamilton as Night Captain
Sidney Bracey as Pop Dryden
Jack Wise as Prison Runner
Jack Mower as First Night Guard
Don Turner as Joe

References

External links 
 

1939 films
Warner Bros. films
American adventure films
1939 adventure films
Films directed by Terry O. Morse
American black-and-white films
Films about the United States Secret Service
1930s English-language films
1930s American films
Films scored by Bernhard Kaun